Thrasher is a surname. Notable people with the surname include:

Buck Thrasher (1889–1938), American baseball player
Craig Thrasher (born 1970), American alpine skier
Daniel Thrasher (born 1993), American YouTuber and musician
Edward L. Thrasher (1892–1971), American city councilor
Frederic Thrasher (1892–1962), American sociologist
Ivan Thrasher (1914–2011), Canadian politician
John Thrasher (1818–1899), American city founder
John E. Thrasher (born 1943), American politician
Joseph Thrasher, American football player and coach
Larry Thrasher (born 1959), American musician
Michael Thrasher, British academic
Neil Thrasher (born 1965), American country singer-songwriter
Richard Thrasher (1922–1993), Canadian politician
Steven Thrasher, British writer and editor
Sunny Besen Thrasher (born 1976), Canadian child actor
Virginia Thrasher (born 1997), American sports shooter

English-language surnames